Myotis izecksohni is a species of mouse-eared bat that is endemic to Brazil and Argentina.

Taxonomy
M. izecksohni was described as a new species in 2011.
The holotype had been collected in 2005 in Tinguá Biological Reserve.
The eponym for the species name "izecksohni" is Brazilian biologist Eugênio Izecksohn.

Description
It is a medium- to large-bodied mouse-eared bat among those found in South America.
Its fur is long with a silky texture; the fur of its back is bicolored, with the basal two-thirds of individual hairs dark, while the distal third is dark-brown to medium-brown.
The fur of its belly is also bicolored, though overall lighter brown than the back fur.
It lacks hairs along the outer edge of the uropatagium, which is a useful field identification characteristic.

Range and habitat
M. izecksohni was first documented in southeastern Brazil and has since been discovered in far northeastern Argentina.

References

Mammals described in 2011
Bats of Brazil
Mammals of Argentina
Mouse-eared bats